Capricorn Caves are located  north of Rockhampton, Queensland, Australia. The limestone caves are one of the largest privately owned cave systems in Australia.

History
It was first discovered in 1881 by Norwegian migrant John Olsen. He went on to claim the land under a lease hold title and open the attraction publicly in 1884. The property was later reclassified to free hold land and is today one of the largest privately owned cave systems in Australia.  The attraction is open to the public and is one of the longest-running tourist attractions in Queensland.

Access
During certain seasons visitors may see insectivorous bats in the caves.

Abseiling, rock climbing, fossicking and animal viewing can be experienced at the 33 hectare property. An adventure course features a climbing wall and rope obstacle.  A range of accommodation facilities are available to visitors.  The complex contains a geo-discovery building which is used for school education programs in biology, geology and environmental studies.

Tours
The tours are run hourly from 9 am till 4 pm with adventure tours run with advance bookings. The Cathedral Tour lasts for one hour and consists of a  walk through the caves with an adventure option at the end negotiating your way through a narrow, zigzag water-formed passageway by candlelight, fairy lights or torch.

The Cathedral Cave Tour allows for wheelchair access. The Cathedral Chamber features excellent natural acoustics and is used for weddings.

Origins
The caves developed in limestone which was formed from corals growing in shallow waters around volcanic islands.  After becoming exposed on land, the limestone was dissolved by acidic rain and underground water.

Awards
The caves received advanced ecotourism certification in 1997.  In 2005, the caves received awards in the Adventure tourism and Best Marketing categories at the Queensland Tourism Awards. In both 2008 and 2009, the Capricorn Caves won the Steve Irwin Ecotourism Award.

See also

List of caves in Australia

References

External links

Tourist attractions in Queensland
Rockhampton
Show caves in Australia
Caves of Queensland